Tiffany Chen Ming-Yin (born January 15, 1959) is a Hong Kong administrative film producer, agent and investor. Chen is the wife of actor-turned-film producer/presenter Charles Heung, and together they run China Star Entertainment Group.

Career
Chen has ancestral home in Heilongjiang.

Chen was diagnosed with leukemia when she was six years old, but a suitable bone marrow donor was found, saving her life.

As a Taiwanese native, Chen moved to Hong Kong in the early 1980s when she married film producer, now-China Star chairman Charles Heung. At his persuasion, Chen quit her career in trading and submerged herself in the world of films, working with Heung in entertainment outfit Win's Entertainment.  In 1984, Heung formed Win's Entertainment Ltd and formed China Star Entertainment Ltd in 1997,which later, beside the Golden Harvest Company became one of the most successful studios in Hong Kong.

Chen serves as both vice-chairman and administrative producer for China Star Entertainment Group. On the credits for China Star films, Chen is usually listed as administrative producer. Under her leadership, China Star films have done remarkably well at the box office. These include the 2000s films Needing You, Love on a Diet, and Lost in Time.

Personal life 
Chen's ancestry is from Harbin, Heilongjiang

In 1980, Chen married Charles Heung. They have 2 sons, Jacky Heung (an actor) and Johnathan.

Chen reportedly criticized pro-democracy protesters during the 2019-2020 Hong Kong protests.

References

Living people
1957 births
Hong Kong film producers
Taiwanese film producers
Taiwanese emigrants to Hong Kong
Hong Kong people of Taiwanese descent